The California Hockey League was an ice hockey league that existed from 1957 to 1963. It was not related to the prior league of the same name that operated from 1928 to 1933.

Franchises
Los Angeles Canadiens/Torrance Olympians (1957–1963)
Pasadena Panthers (1957–1958, 1959-1960)	
Paramount Hornets/Long Beach Hornets (1957–1960)	
[Hollywood Bears] (1957–1959)
Phoenix Apaches (1958–1959)
Ontario Canucks (1958–1959)
Hollywood Stars (1959–1960)
Long Beach Paramounts/Long Beach Buccaneers/Long Beach Gulls (1960–1963)
San Gabriel (1960–1961)
San Diego Skyhawks (1960–1962)
Burbank Stars (1961–1963)
Bakersfield Kernals (1962–1963)

Defunct ice hockey leagues in the United States